Arnold Oberschelp (born 5 February 1932 in Recklinghausen) is a German mathematician and logician.

Life
Oberschelp studied mathematics and physics at the universities of Göttingen and Münster. In Münster he received in December 1957 his doctorate in mathematical logic under Hans Hermes. In 1958 he was a research assistant at the Mathematical Institute of the Technical College of Hannover (now Leibniz University Hannover) where he habilitated in mathematics in 1961. In 1968, he accepted an appointment as full professor of logic and science at the University of Kiel. Oberschelp has been emeritus professor since 1997.

Arnold Oberschelp developed a general class logic in which arbitrary classes can be formed without the contradictions of naive set theory. Additional axioms result in the Zermelo–Fraenkel set theory, which is much more handy in his class-logical representation than in the usual predicate logical representation.

In 1962 he gave a lecture as an invited speaker at the International Congress of Mathematicians in Stockholm on classes as "primal elements" in set theory.

In September 2019, he received the German Institute for Standardization's Beuth Memorial Coin in recognition of his services to standardization in mathematics and technical foundations.

Selected works 
 
  
 
 
 Elementare Logik und Mengenlehre I/II. Bibliographisches Institut, Mannheim/Wien/Zürich 1974/1978, .
 
 Jürgen-Michael Glubrecht, Arnold Oberschelp, Günter Todt: Klassenlogik. Bibliographisches Institut, Mannheim/Wien/Zürich 1983, .
  — Review: 
 Allgemeine Mengenlehre. BI-Wiss.-Verlag, Mannheim/Leipzig/Wien/Zürich 1994, .
 Logik für Philosophen. 2nd ed., Metzler, Stuttgart/Weimar 1997, .

References

External links 
 
 

20th-century German mathematicians
1932 births
Academic staff of the University of Kiel
University of Göttingen alumni
University of Münster alumni
Academic staff of the University of Hanover
Set theorists
People from Recklinghausen
Living people